The   of Hankyu Railway is one of the three  major commuter heavy rail lines in the Keihanshin conurbation of Japan. It links the urban centres of Osaka and Kobe by connecting the major stations of Umeda in Osaka and Sannomiya in Kobe.

The Hanshin Electric Railway Main Line and West Japan Railway Company (JR West) Tokaido Main Line (this section nicknamed JR Kobe Line) are the two lines parallel to the Hankyu Kobe Line within a short distance of each other.

Definition
The line  is commonly called  for short, but in the broader sense 'Kobe Line' refers to the entire network of the trunk Kobe Main Line and connecting branch lines of Itami, Imazu and Kōyō Lines.

Network
At the Kobe end of the line some trains continue through onto the Kobe Rapid Railway, an underground line allowing interchange between the lines of several commuter rail companies operating in Kobe.

The Kobe Main Line has interchanges at several of its stations with other lines operated by Hankyu. The Hankyu main lines to Kyoto and Takarazuka share stations at Umeda and Juso with the Kobe Line. The other lines with connections to the Kobe line are smaller lines with only local trains: the Itami Line connects at Tsukaguchi, the Imazu Line at Nishinomiya-kitaguchi and the Koyo Line at Shukugawa.

History
The Umeda - Juso section was opened in 1910 as part of the Hankyu Takarazuka Line.

The Juso - Oji-Koen section opened as a 1435mm gauge line electrified at 600 VDC in 1920. In 1926 the line was duplicated, and in 1936 it was extended to Kobe Sannomiya. In 1967 the voltage was increased to 1500 VDC.

Until 1936, the line's terminal in Kobe was in Kamitsutsui. As a branch of the main line, the  line between Oji-Koen Station and Kamitsutsui Station continued to provide a connection to the Kobe tram network until 1941.

The Kobe Main Line was damaged by the Great Hanshin earthquake in January 1995. Restoration work on the Kobe Line took 7 months to complete. 

Station numbering was introduced on 21 December 2013.

Future plans 
A new station will be built near the Muko River between Nishinomiya-Kitaguchi and Tsukaguchi. The project, which includes a bicycle parking lot and reconstruction of the surrounding roads, is expected to cost . Aggrements to build the station were signed by the railway and the national treasury was signed in October 2022.

Train services
Regular train services on the lines come in two kinds: the local trains (普通) which stop at all stations, and the limited express trains (特急) which stop only at major stations along the line.  Other commuter and express services operate only during limited time periods:
Express trains (急行) are operated from Umeda to Kobe-sannomiya or Nishinomiya-Kitaguchi in the morning on weekdays and every midnight.  There is also the only eastbound express train operated from Kobe-sannomiya to Umeda every early morning and the only westbound express train from Umeda to Shinkaichi in the midnight except weekdays.  
Rapid Express trains (快速急行) are operated between Umeda and Kosoku Kobe or Shinkaichi every midnight.  There is also the only eastbound rapid express train operated from Shinkaichi for Umeda every early morning.
Commuter Express trains (通勤急行, simply "Express") are operated on weekdays, from Kobe-sannomiya to Umeda in the morning, and from Umeda to Kobe-sannomiya in the evening and at night.
Commuter Limited Express trains (通勤特急, simply "Limited Express") are operated in both directions on weekday mornings.
Semi-Express trains (準急) are operated from Takarazuka to Umeda via the Imazu Line and the Kobe Line on weekday mornings.
Maximum speed:

Stations
● : All trains stop
| : All trains pass
◆ : Extra services to the Imazu Line pass

Rolling stock
 1000 series EMU (from November 2013)
 5000 series EMU
 6000 series EMU
 7000 series EMU
 8000 series EMU
 8200 series EMU (Rush hour only)
 9000 series EMU

Former
 1000 series EMU (1954)
 1010 series EMU
 1200 series EMU
 2000 series EMU
 2200 series EMU
 2300 series EMU (Temporary)
 3000 series EMU
 5100 series EMU
 5200 series EMU

See also
 Hankyū Kyōto Main Line
 Hankyū Takarazuka Main Line

References

External links 

 Official website (in English)
 Official website (in Japanese)

 
K
Rail transport in Osaka Prefecture
Rail transport in Hyōgo Prefecture
Railway lines opened in 1936